"Bring the Rain" is a song by American Christian rock band MercyMe from their 2006 album Coming Up to Breathe. It was released on March 24, 2007, as the third radio single. The song became the band's sixth Hot Christian Songs No. 1, staying there for one week. It lasted 32 weeks on the overall chart. The song is played in an A major key at 158 beats per minute.

Background

Composition
"Bring The Rain" is a five minute and thirty second track. The song is the only track on the album to directly say the name Jesus. It uses his name in the refrain "Jesus, bring the rain".

Critical reception
Tony Cummings of Cross Rhythms praised the vocals and string arrangements as well as the choir from "Bring the Rain".

Track listing
CD release
 "Bring The Rain (Track with Background Vocals)" – 5:30
 "Bring The Rain (Track with No Background Vocals)" – 5:31
 "Bring The Rain (Low Key Track with No Background Vocals)" – 5:31
 "Bring The Rain (High Key Track with No Background Vocals)" – 5:31
 "Bring The Rain" – 5:30

Awards

In 2008, the song was nominated for a Dove Award for Song of the Year at the 39th GMA Dove Awards.

Charts

Weekly charts

Year-end charts

Decade-end charts

References

MercyMe songs
2007 singles
2006 songs
Songs written by Bart Millard